Lehtinenia is a genus of Asian araneomorph spiders in the family Tetrablemmidae that was first described by Y. F. Tong & S. Q. Li in 2008.  it contains three species, found in Asia: L. arcus, L. bicornis, and L. bisulcus. It is named in honor of Pekka T. Lehtinen.

See also
 List of Tetrablemmidae species
 Pekka T. Lehtinen

References

Araneomorphae genera
Spiders of Asia
Tetrablemmidae